Akgul Amanmuradova and Valentina Ivakhnenko were the defending champions but chose not to participate.

Dalila Jakupović and Ivana Jorović won the title, defeating Emily Appleton and Prarthana Thombare in the final, 6–4, 6–3.

Seeds

Draw

Draw

References

External Links
Main Draw

Liepāja Open - Doubles